Gilbert Segrave (1266 – 1316) was a medieval Bishop of London. He was the son of Nicholas Segrave, 1st Baron Segrave.

Segrave obtained the living of Kegworth, Leicestershire in 1279. He was then, with a dispensation for plurality, given the livings of both Harlaxton, Staffordshire in 1282 and Aylestone, Leicestershire in 1292.

Segrave was elected as Bishop of London on 17 August, that election confirmed on 17 September and consecrated on 25 November 1313. Segrave died on 18 December 1316.

Citations

References

 
 

1266 births
1316 deaths
Bishops of London
14th-century English Roman Catholic bishops
Younger sons of barons